The Serra do Mar State Park is a state park in the state of São Paulo, Brazil. The State Park stretches from the border of Rio de Janeiro to Itariri in the southern part of São Paulo.

Location

The Serra do Mar State Park was created in 1977, when the BR-101 coastal highway was built, and expanded in 2010.
The park contains some traditional communities of quilombolas, Amerindians, caipiras and caiçaras.
It connects the Serra do Mar forests of Rio de Janeiro to the Vale do Ribeira and Paraná. The escarpments of the park dominate the coast of São Paulo. It is part of the  Bocaina Mosaic, created in 2006.

Conservation

The Serra do Mar State Park is managed by the Forestry Foundation of São Paulo, which is linked to the São Paulo Secretariat of State for the Environment.
The forest provides refuge to hundreds of species of birds and other animals.
The park protects water sources that supply part of the São Paulo metropolitan region, Baixada Santista, Litoral Norte, and the Paraíba Valley.
It also helps moderate the climate and maintain the stability of the slopes.

References

Sources

State parks of Brazil
Protected areas of São Paulo (state)
Protected areas established in 1977
1977 establishments in Brazil